Bluewater Airport  is an aircraft landing area in Bluewater Park, Queensland.

In April 2015, a proposal was made to expand Bluewater Airport for freight and training purposes. However, in March 2016, plans to expand had been stalled due to a pending investigation into heavy aircraft landing at the airport.

See also
 List of airports in Queensland

External links
Official website

References

Airports in Queensland